During the Second World War (1939–1945), India was a part of the British Empire. India officially declared war on Nazi Germany in September 1939. India, as a part of the Allied Nations, sent over two and a half million soldiers to fight under British command against the Axis powers. India also provided the base for American operations in support of China in the China Burma India Theater.

Indians fought with distinction throughout the world, including in the European theatre against Germany, North African Campaign against fascist Italy, and in the southeast Asian theatre; while also defending the Indian subcontinent against the Japanese forces, including British Burma and the Crown colony of Ceylon. Indian troops were also redeployed in former colonies such as Singapore and Hong Kong, with the Japanese surrender in August 1945, after the end of World War II. Over 87,000 Indian troops, and 3 million civilians died in World War II. Field Marshal Sir Claude Auchinleck, former Commander-in-Chief, India, stated that Britain "couldn't have come through both wars [World War I and II] if they hadn't had the Indian Army."

Viceroy Linlithgow declared that India was at war with Germany without consultations with Indian politicians. Political parties such as the Muslim League and the Hindu Mahasabha supported the British war effort while the largest and most influential political party existing in India at the time, the Indian National Congress, demanded independence before it would help Britain. London refused, and when Congress announced a "Quit India" campaign in August 1942, tens of thousands of its leaders were imprisoned by the British for the duration. Meanwhile, under the leadership of Indian leader Subhash Chandra Bose, Japan set up an army of Indian POWs known as the Indian National Army, which fought against the British. A major famine in Bengal in 1943 led to between 0.8 and 3.8 million deaths due to starvation, and a highly controversial issue remains regarding Churchill's alleged decision to not provide emergency food relief.
 
Indian participation in the Allied campaign remained strong. The financial, industrial and military assistance of India formed a crucial component of the British campaign against Nazi Germany and Imperial Japan. India's strategic location at the tip of the Indian Ocean, its large production of armaments, and its huge armed forces played a decisive role in halting the progress of Imperial Japan in the South-East Asian theatre. The Indian Army during World War II was one of the largest Allied forces contingents which took part in the North and East African Campaign, Western Desert Campaign. At the height of the second World War, more than 2.5 million Indian troops were fighting Axis forces around the globe. After the end of the war, India  emerged as the world's fourth largest industrial power and its increased political, economic and military influence paved the way for its independence from the United Kingdom in 1947.

Quit India movement

The Indian National Congress, led by Mohandas Karamchand Gandhi, Sardar Vallabhbhai Patel and Maulana Azad, denounced Nazi Germany but would not fight it or anyone else until India was independent.  Congress launched the Quit India Movement in August 1942, refusing to co-operate in any way with the government until independence was granted.  The government, not ready for this, immediately arrested over 60,000 national and local Congress leaders, and then moved to suppress the violent reaction of Congress supporters. Key leaders were kept in prison until June 1945, although Gandhi was released in May 1944 because of his health. Congress, with its leaders incommunicado, played little role on the home front. Unlike the predominately Hindu Congress, the Muslim League rejected the Quit India movement and worked closely with the Raj authorities.

Supporters of the British Raj argued that decolonisation was impossible in the middle of a great war. So, in 1939, the British Viceroy, Lord Linlithgow declared India's entry into the War without consulting prominent Indian Congress leaders who were just elected in previous elections.

Subhas Chandra Bose (also called Netaji) had been a top Congress leader. He broke up with the Congress and tried to form a military alliance with Germany or Japan to gain independence.  Bose, with the assistance of Germany, formed the Indian Legion from Indian students in Axis occupied Europe and Indian Army prisoners of war.  With German reversals in 1942 and 1943, Bose and the Legion's officers were transported by U boat to Japanese territory to continue his plans. Upon arrival, Japan helped him set up the Indian National Army (INA) which fought under Japanese direction, mostly in the Burma Campaign.  Bose also headed the Provisional Government of Free India, a government-in-exile based in Singapore. It controlled no Indian territory and was used only to raise troops for Japan.

British Indian Army 

In 1939 the British Indian Army numbered 205,000 men. It took in volunteers and by 1945 was the largest all-volunteer force in history, rising to over 3.35  million men. These forces included tank, artillery and airborne forces. Indian personnel of the British Indian Army received 6,000 awards for gallantry, including 31 Victoria Crosses.

The Middle East and African theatre

The British government meanwhile sent Indian troops to fight in West Asia and northern Africa against the Axis. India also geared up to produce essential goods such as food and uniforms.

The 4th, 5th and 10th Indian Divisions took part in the North African theatre against Rommel's Afrika Korps. In addition, the 18th Brigade of the 8th Indian Division fought at Alamein. Earlier, the 4th and 5th Indian Divisions took part in the East African campaign against the Italians in Somaliland, Eritrea and Abyssinia capturing the mountain fortress of Keren.

In the Battle of Bir Hacheim, Indian gunners played an important role by using guns in the anti tank role and destroying tanks of Rommel's panzer divisions. Maj PPK Kumaramangalam was the battery commander of 41 Field Regiment which was deployed in the anti tank role. He was awarded the DSO for his act of bravery. Later he became the Chief of Army Staff of India in 1967.

South-East Asian theatre

The British Indian Army was the key British Empire fighting presence in the Burma Campaign. The Royal Indian Air force's first assault mission was carried out against Japanese troops stationed in Burma. The British Indian Army was key to breaking the siege of Imphal when the westward advance of Imperial Japan came to a halt.

The formations included the Indian III Corps, IV Corps, the Indian XXXIII Corps and the Fourteenth Army. As part of the new concept of Long Range Penetration (LRP), Gurkha troops of the Indian Army were trained in the present state of Madhya Pradesh under their commander (later Major General) Orde Charles Wingate.

These troops, popularly known as Chindits, played a crucial role in halting the Japanese advance into South Asia.

Capture of Indian territory

By 1942, neighbouring Burma was invaded by Japan, which by then had already captured the Indian territory of Andaman and Nicobar Islands.  Japan gave nominal control of the islands to the Provisional Government of Free India on 21 October 1943, and in the following March, the Indian National Army with the help of Japan crossed into India and advanced as far as Kohima in Nagaland. This advance on the mainland of South Asia reached its farthest point on India territory, with the Japanese finally retreating from the Battle of Kohima and near simultaneous Battle of Imphal in June 1944.

Recapture of Axis-occupied territory
In 1944–45 Japan was under heavy air bombardment at home and suffered massive naval defeats in the Pacific. As its Imphal offensive failed, harsh weather and disease and withdrawal of air cover (due to more pressing needs in the Pacific) also took its toll on the Japanese and remnants of the INA and the Burma National Army. In spring 1945, a resurgent British army recaptured the occupied lands.

The invasion of Italy
 
Indian forces played a role in liberating Italy from Nazi control. India contributed the third largest Allied contingent in the Italian campaign after US and British forces. The 4th, 8th and 10th Divisions and 43rd Gurkha Infantry Brigade led the advance, notably at the gruelling Battle of Monte Cassino. They fought on the Gothic Line in 1944 and 1945.

Royal Indian Air Force 

During World War II, the IAF played an instrumental role in halting the advance of the Japanese army in Burma, where the first IAF air strike was executed. The target for this first mission was the Japanese military base in Arakan, after which IAF strike missions continued against the Japanese airbases at Mae Hong Son, Chiang Mai and Chiang Rai in northern Thailand.

The IAF was mainly involved in strike, close air support, aerial reconnaissance, bomber escort and pathfinding missions for RAF and USAAF heavy bombers. RAF and IAF pilots would train by flying with their non-native air wings to gain combat experience and communication proficiency. Besides operations in the Burma Theatre IAF pilots participated in air operations in North Africa and Europe.

In addition to the IAF, many native Indians and some 200 Indians resident in Britain volunteered to join the RAF and Women's Auxiliary Air Force. One such volunteer was Sergeant Shailendra Eknath Sukthankar, who served as a navigator with No. 83 Squadron. Sukthankar was commissioned as an officer, and on 14 September 1943, received the DFC. Squadron Leader Sukthankar eventually completed 45 operations, 14 of them on board the RAF Museum's Avro Lancaster R5868. Another volunteer was Assistant Section Officer Noor Inayat Khan a Muslim pacifist and Indian nationalist who joined the WAAF, in November 1940, to fight against Nazism. Noor Khan served bravely as a secret agent with the Special Operations Executive (SOE) in France, but was eventually betrayed and captured. Many of these Indian airmen were seconded or transferred to the expanding IAF such as Squadron Leader Mohinder Singh Pujji DFC who led No. 4 Squadron IAF in Burma.

During the war, the IAF experienced a phase of steady expansion. New aircraft added to the fleet included the US-built Vultee Vengeance, Douglas Dakota, the British Hawker Hurricane, Supermarine Spitfire, Bristol Blenheim, and Westland Lysander.

Subhas Chandra Bose sent Indian National Army youth cadets to Japan to train as pilots. They went on to attend the Imperial Japanese Army Air Force Academy in 1944.

In recognition of the valiant service by the IAF, King George VI conferred the prefix "Royal" in 1945. Thereafter the IAF was referred to as the Royal Indian Air Force. In 1950, when India became a republic, the prefix was dropped and it reverted to being the Indian Air Force.

Post war, No. 4 Squadron IAF was sent to Japan as part of the Allied Occupation forces.

Royal Indian Navy 

In 1934, the Royal Indian Marine changed its name, with the enactment of the Indian Navy (Discipline) Act of 1934. The Royal Indian Navy was formally inaugurated on 2 October 1934, at Bombay. Its ships carried the prefix HMIS, for His Majesty's Indian Ship.

At the start of the Second World War, the Royal Indian Navy was small, with only eight warships. The onset of the war led to an expansion in vessels and personnel described by one writer as "phenomenal". By 1943 the strength of the RIN had reached twenty thousand.
During the War, the Women's Royal Indian Naval Service was established, for the first time giving women a role in the navy, although they did not serve on board its ships.

For the next six months these two ships joined the Clyde Escort Force, operating in the Atlantic and later the Irish Sea Escort Force where they acted as the senior ships of the groups. While engaged on these duties, numerous attacks against U-boats were carried out and attacks by hostile aircraft repelled. At the time of action in which the Bismarck was involved, the Sutlej left Scapa Flow, with all despatch as the senior member of a group, to take over a convoy from the destroyers which were finally engaged in the sinking of the Bismarck.

These six ships and the minesweepers all eventually proceeded to India carrying out various duties in the North Atlantic, Mediterranean and Cape stations en route.

HMIS Bengal was a part of the Eastern Fleet during World War II, and escorted numerous convoys between 1942 and 1945.

The sloops  and  played a role in Operation Husky, the Allied invasion of Sicily by providing air defence and anti-submarine screening to the invasion fleet.

Furthermore, the Royal Indian Navy participated in convoy escort duties in the Indian Ocean and Mediterranean and was heavily involved in combat operations as part of the Burma Campaign, carrying out raids, shore bombardment, naval invasion support and other activities culminating in Operation Dracula and the mopping up operations during the final stages of the war.

Royal Indian Naval combat losses 
The sloop HMIS Pathan sunk in June 1940 by the Italian Navy Submarine Galvani during the East African Campaign

In the days immediately following the Attack on Pearl Harbor,  was patrolling the Laccadive Islands in search of Japanese ships and submarines. At midnight on 9 December 1941, HMS Glasgow sank the RIN patrol vessel HMIS Prabhavati with two lighters in tow en route to Karachi, with 6-inch shells at 6,000 yards (5,500 m). Prabhavati was alongside the lighters and was mistaken for a surfaced Japanese submarine.

 was sunk by Japanese aircraft during Burma Campaign on 6 April 1942.

Royal Indian Naval successes 

 was ordered in 1939, and built by William Denny and Brothers. She was commissioned in 1941, and with World War II underway, was immediately deployed as a convoy escort. Jumna served as an anti-aircraft escort during the Java Sea campaign in early 1942, and was involved in intensive anti-aircraft action against attacking Japanese twin-engined level bombers and dive bombers, claiming five aircraft downed from 24 to 28 February 1942.

In June 1942  was involved in the defence of Sydney Harbour during the attack on Sydney Harbour.

On 11 November 1942, Bengal was escorting the Dutch tanker Ondina to the southwest of Cocos Islands in the Indian Ocean. Two Japanese commerce raiders armed with six-inch guns attacked Ondina. Bengal fired her single four-inch gun and Ondina fired her 102 mm and both scored hits on Hōkoku Maru, which shortly blew up and sank.

On 12 Feb 1944, the Japanese submarine RO-110 was depth charged and sunk east-south-east off Visakhapatnam, India by the Indian sloop  and the Australian minesweepers HMAS Launceston and HMAS Ipswich (J186). RO-110 had attacked convoy JC-36 (Colombo-Calcutta) and torpedoed and damaged the British merchant Asphalion (6274 GRT).

Collaboration with the Axis powers 

Several leaders of the radical revolutionary Indian independence movement broke away from the main Congress and went to war against Britain. Subhas Chandra Bose, once a prominent leader in the Indian National Congress, volunteered to help Nazi Germany and Japan; he claimed in speeches that Britain's opposition to Nazism and Fascism was "hypocrisy", since Britain was itself denying individual liberties to Indians. Moreover, he argued that it was not Germany and Japan but the British Raj which was the enemy, since the British were over-exploiting Indian resources for the  war. Bose suggested that there was little possibility of India being attacked by any of the Axis powers provided it did not fight the war on Britain's side.

Nazi Germany was encouraging but gave little help. Bose then approached the Japanese Empire at Tokyo, which gave him control of Indian forces it had organised.

The Indian National Army (INA), formed first by Mohan Singh Deb, consisted initially of prisoners taken by the Japanese in Malaya and at Singapore who were offered the choice of serving the INA by Japan or remaining  in very poor conditions in POW camps. Later, after it was reorganised under Subhas Chandra Bose, it drew civilian volunteers from Malaya and Burma. Ultimately, a force of under 40,000 was formed, although only two divisions ever participated in battle. Intelligence and special services groups from the INA were instrumental in destabilising the British Indian Army in the early stages of the Arakan offensive. It was during this time that the British Military Intelligence began propaganda work to shield the true numbers who joined the INA, and also described stories of Japanese brutalities that indicated INA involvement. Further, the Indian press was prohibited from publishing any accounts whatsoever of the INA.

As the Japanese offensive opened, the INA was sent into battle. Bose hoped to avoid set-piece battles for which it lacked arms, armament as well as man-power.  Initially, he sought to obtain arms as well as increase its ranks from British Indian soldiers he hoped would defect to his cause. Once the Japanese forces were able to break the British defences at Imphal, he planned for the INA to cross the hills of North-East India into the Gangetic plain, where it was to work as a guerrilla army and expected to live off the land, garner support, supplies, and ranks from amongst the local populace to ultimately touch off a revolution.

Prem Kumar Sahgal, an officer of the INA once Military secretary to Subhas Bose and later tried in the first Red Fort trials, explained that although the war itself hung in balance and nobody was sure if the Japanese would win, initiating a popular revolution with grass-root support within India would ensure that even if Japan lost the war ultimately, Britain would not be in a position to re-assert its colonial authority, which was ultimately the aim of the INA and Azad Hind.

As Japan opened its offensive towards India, the INA's first division, consisting of four Guerrilla regiments, participated in Arakan offensive in 1944, with one battalion reaching as far as Mowdok in Chittagong. Other units were directed to Imphal and Kohima, as well as to protect Japanese flanks to the south of Arakan, a task it successfully carried out. However, the first division suffered the same fate as did Mutaguchi's Army when the siege of Imphal was broken. With little or no supplies and supply lines deluged by the Monsoon, harassed by Allied air dominance, the INA began withdrawing when the 15th Army and Burma Area Army began withdrawing, and suffered the same terrible fate as wounded, starved and diseased men succumbed during the hasty withdrawal into Burma. Later in the war however, the INA's second division, tasked with the defence of Irrawaddy and the adjoining areas around Nangyu, was instrumental in opposing Messervy's 7th Indian Infantry Division when it attempted to cross the river at Pagan and Nyangyu during the successful  Burma Campaign by the Allies the following year. The 2nd division was instrumental in denying the 17th Indian Infantry Division the area around Mount Popa that would have exposed the flank of Kimura's forces attempting to retake Meiktila and Nyangyu. Ultimately however, the division was obliterated. Some of the surviving units of the INA surrendered as Rangoon fell, and helped keep order till the allied forces entered the city. The other remnants began a long march over land and on foot towards Singapore, along with Subhas Chandra Bose. As the Japanese situation became precarious, Bose left for Manchuria to attempt to contact the Russians, and was reported to have died in an air crash near Taiwan.

The only Indian territory that the Azad Hind government controlled was nominally the Andaman and Nicobar Islands. However, they were bases for the Japanese Navy, and the navy never relinquished control. Enraged with the lack of administrative control, the Azad Hind Governor, Lt. Col. Loganathan, later relinquished his authority.  After the War, a number of officers of the INA were tried for treason. However, faced with the possibility of a massive civil unrest and a mutiny in the Indian Army, the British officials decided to release the prisoners-of-war; in addition, the event became a turning point to expedite the process of transformation of power and independence of India.

Bengal famine

The region of Bengal in India suffered a devastating famine from 1940 to 1943. Some of the key reasons for this famine are:

 British export of food and material for the war in Europe;
 Japanese invasion of Burma which cut off food and other essential supplies to the region;
 British denial orders destroying essential food transportation throughout the Eastern region;
 British banned transfer of grain from other provinces, turning down offers of grain from Australia;
 mismanagement by British Indian regional governments; 
 constructing 900 airfields (2000 acres each) taking that huge amount of land out of agriculture in a time of dire need;
 price inflation caused by war production
 increase in demand partially as a result of refugees from Burma and Bengal.

The British government denied an urgent request from Leopold Amery, the Indian secretary of state, and Archibald Wavell, the Viceroy of India, to stop exports of food from Bengal in order that it might be used for famine relief. Winston Churchill, then prime minister, dismissed these requests in a fashion that Amery regarded as "Hitler-like," by asking why, if the famine was so horrible, Gandhi had not yet died of starvation.

Indian Economist Amartya Sen (1976) challenged this orthodoxy, reviving the claim that there was no shortage of food in Bengal and that the famine was caused by inflation.

Princely states

During World War II, in 1941, the British presented a captured German BF 109 single-engined fighter to the Nizam of Hyderabad, in return for the funding of 2 RAF fighter squadrons.

There was a campsite for Polish refugees at Valivade, in Kolhapur State, it was the largest settlement of Polish refugees in India during the war. Another such campsite for Polish refugee children was located in Balachadi, it was built by K. S. Digvijaysinhji, Jam Saheb Maharaja of Nawanagar State in 1942, near his summer resort. He gave refuge to hundreds of Polish children rescued from Soviet camps (Gulags). The campsite is now part of the Sainik School.

1944–45 Insurgency in Balochistan 
From 1944 to 1945, Daru Khan Badinzai led an insurgency against the authorities of the Raj. It began in the first half of 1944, when rebels of the Badinzai tribe began interfering with road construction on the British side of the Balochistan border. The insurgency had subsided by March 1945.

Mazrak Zadran's invasion of India 

In 1944, the Southern and Eastern provinces of Afghanistan entered a state of turmoil, with the Zadran, Safi and Mangal tribes rising up against the Afghan government. Among the leaders of the revolt was the Zadran chieftain, Mazrak Zadran, who opted to invade British-occupied India in late 1944. There he was joined by a Baloch chieftain, Sultan Ahmed. Mazrak was forced to retreat back into Afghanistan due to British aerial bombardment.

See also

 Propaganda and India in World War II
 Burma Campaign
 Indian Army during World War II
 List of Indian divisions in World War I
 Military history of India
 Military production during World War II
 Military history of the British Commonwealth in the Second World War

Notes 

26. Henry Boot and Ray Sturtivant. Gifts of War
27. Brett Holman. The Imperial Aircraft Flotilla - II

Further reading
 Bandyopadhyay, Sekhar. From Plassey to Partition: A History of Modern India  (2004)
 Barkawi, Tarak. "Culture and Combat In the Colonies: The Indian Army In the Second World War," Journal of Contemporary History  (2006) 41#2 pp 325–355 doi=10.1177/0022009406062071  online
 Bhatia, Harbans Singh, Military History of British India, 1607–1947 (1977)
 Brown, Judith M. Modern India: The Origins of an Asian Democracy (1994)
 Brown, Judith M. Gandhi: Prisoner of Hope (1991)
.
 Collins, D.J.E. The Royal Indian Navy (1964 online official history
 Gopal, Sarvepalli. Jawaharlal Nehru: A Biography (1976)
 Herman, Arthur.  Gandhi & Churchill: The Epic Rivalry that Destroyed an Empire and Forged Our Age (2009), pp 443–539.

 Jalal, Ayesha. The Sole Spokesman: Jinnah, the Muslim League and the Demand for Pakistan  (1993), 
 James, Lawrence. Raj: the making and remaking of British India (1997) pp 545–85, narrative history.
Joshi, Vandana. "Memory and Memorialisation, Interment and Exhumation, Propaganda and Politics during WWII through the lens of International Tracing Service (ITS) Collections", in MIDA Archival Reflexicon (2019), pp. 1–12.
 Judd, Dennis. The Lion and the Tiger: The Rise and Fall of the British Raj, 1600–1947 (2004)
 Karnad, Raghu. Farthest Field - An Indian Story of the Second World War (Harper Collins India, 2015) 
 Khan, Yasmin. India At War: The Subcontinent and the Second World War (2015), wide-ranging scholarly survey excerpt; also published as The Raj At War: A People's History Of India's Second World War (2015)' online review
 Marston, Daniel. The Indian Army and the end of the Raj (Cambridge UP, 2014).
 Moore, Robin J. "India in the 1940s", in Robin Winks, ed. Oxford History of the British Empire: Historiography (2001), pp. 231–242
 Mukerjee, Madhusree. Churchill's Secret War: The British Empire and the Ravaging of India during World War II (2010).
 Raghavan,  Srinath. India's War: World War II and the Making of Modern South Asia (2016). wide-ranging scholarly survey excerpt
 Read, Anthony, and David Fisher. The Proudest Day: India's Long Road to Independence (1999)  online edition; detailed scholarly history of 1940–47
 Roy, Kaushik. "Military Loyalty in the Colonial Context: A Case Study of the Indian Army during World War II." Journal of Military History 73.2 (2009): 497–529.
 Voigt, Johannes. India in The Second World War (1988).
 Wolpert, Stanley A. Jinnah of Pakistan (2005).

External links 
 

 
.01
 
World War II
World War II
World War II
World War II
World War II
World War II
Politics of World War II
World War II national military histories